Romanetto (romaneto in Czech) is a literary genre typical for the Czech writer Jakub Arbes. The first one to name the genre was Jan Neruda, who used an italic diminutive system to change the word román - Czech for novel. Works in this genre are usually shorter than a novel and their stories include something seemingly paranormal, which is explained afterwards with the use of scientific facts. Although this genre came before, it resembles science fiction.

The most famous romanetto by Arbes is called Svatý Xaverius (The Saint Xaverius). The story tells about searching for treasure by a picture of painter Xaver Balko.

Czech literature